Isidor "Jack" Niflot (April 16, 1881 – May 29, 1950) was an American wrestler who competed in the 1904 Summer Olympics. He won a gold medal in the freestyle bantamweight category. Niflot was born in Poland and raised in New York, New York. He was later a long time Sullivan County, New York resident.

The bantamweight division was the third lightest freestyle wrestling weight class, held as part of the 1904 Summer Olympics programme. It was the first time the event, like all other freestyle wrestling events, was held in Olympic competition. Seven wrestlers competed, with Niflot winning the gold medal.

References

External links
profile

1881 births
1950 deaths
Wrestlers at the 1904 Summer Olympics
American male sport wrestlers
Olympic gold medalists for the United States in wrestling
Place of birth missing
Medalists at the 1904 Summer Olympics
19th-century American people
20th-century American people
Polish emigrants to the United States